Recep Tayyip Erdoğan, incumbent President of Turkey since 2014, was officially nominated as the presidential candidate of the Justice and Development Party (AKP) on 3 May 2018. Shortly thereafter, the nominally oppositional Nationalist Movement Party (MHP) reiterated that it would endorse Erdoğan's candidacy, and would jointly apply to the electoral commission for its formal registration.  After the MHP announced that they will endorse Erdoğan’s campaign, the BBP announced the support for Erdoğan’s candidacy. In early May, it was confirmed by Erdoğan that he would be visiting the Bosnian capital of Sarajevo in the early stages of the campaign, most likely on 20 May 2018, and hold campaign rallies with the Bosnian Turks to drum up support for his re-election bid.

Program 
Defending “Yes” for the 2017 Turkish constitutional referendum
18 proposed amendments to the Constitution of Turkey(Full details)
"Our youth are our strongest quality, in terms of economic growth we will make the best use of this quality," Erdogan said, before promising more female participation in the country's workforce.
"When we [AK Party] came to government, we moved our country from low-wage level to mid-wage level, and now our aim is to move to higher levels on that scale," he said.
Relations with EU
”Erdogan's remarks came shortly after the country's central bank announced a sharp interest rate rise from 13.5 percent to 16.5 percent to halt the fall in the value of the lira.”
”He also said he will attempt to repair strained relations with countries in Europe.”
"We will strengthen our economic and political ties with various regional structures, especially the EU. We want all brotherly nations in our region and the world to reach better welfare, together with our nation," Erdogan said.
Women's participation
”Improving women's work opportunities will also continue to be high on the political agenda, the president said.”
"We have come a long way in bringing our women to the positions they deserve. We will continue to increase women's participation in every area, from politics to bureaucracy, culture to art, and to non-governmental activities," he said.
“Turkey will keep fighting with  Kurdish separatists and Islamic State of Iraq and the Levant who cause terror attacks in the country.”

Election result

Party representation 
Justice and Development Party
Nationalist Movement Party
Great Unity Party
Free Cause Party

References 

2018 Turkish general election
Presidential campaign
Erdoğan
2018 presidential campaigns